Winterthur Wülflingen railway station is a railway station that serves Wülflingen, which is district number 6 in Winterthur, a city in the canton of Zurich, Switzerland.  It forms part of the Winterthur–Bülach–Koblenz railway.

The station's architectural features, consisting of a station building and a goods shed, are inscribed on the Swiss Inventory of Cultural Property of National Significance, as a typical station from the turn of the century.

Location
The station is situated to the southeast of the Wülflingen district, and separated from the district's centre by the A1/A4 motorway.

History
At the time of their planning and construction, the railway line and station were outside the district limits, and it was anticipated that they would serve primarily freight traffic to and from the spinning factory.  For that reason, work began in 1875 on the construction of a simple timber station building.  This building, a freight shed with integrated station office, was ready for occupation in time for the opening of the Winterthur–Bülach–Koblenz railway.

Due to industrialization and a consequential increase in the residential population, the town gradually expanded enough to reach the station, making a proper station building necessary. That is why the present station building, which, at the time, was promoted in Wülflingen in exaggerated fashion with a direct "Wülflingen–Paris" rail link, was built in 1908.

The original building, located west of the 1908 station building, has remained to this day as a goods shed.

Facilities 
Winterthur Wülflingen has two platform tracks.  The station itself is now unstaffed, and a restaurant is housed in the station building. Opposite the station is the Niderfeld industrial zone, which is connected to the railway tracks.

Services

Zürich S-Bahn 
Although the station used to offer continuous passenger connections from Winterthur to Basel, it is now served by only one line of the Zürich S-Bahn, operated by THURBO:

 

On weekends, Wülflingen is served by one train pair of the THURBO «Nightliner», which runs as far as Bülach.

   Winterthur – Bülach

Local transport 
One Stadtbus Winterthur bus line calls at Wülflingen.

As of the December 2010 timetable change, there was also an extra weekend night bus line, which ran at similar intervals to the daytime service.

See also 

History of rail transport in Switzerland
Rail transport in Switzerland

References

External links 
 
 SBB-CFF-FFS website (Swiss rail operator)

This article is based upon a translation of the German language version as at November 2011.

Railway stations in the canton of Zürich
Swiss Federal Railways stations
Transport in Winterthur
Railway stations in Switzerland opened in 1876